The 1911 United States Senate election in New York was held from January 17 to March 31, 1911, by the New York State Legislature to elect a U.S. Senator to represent the State of New York in the United States Senate.

The initial Democratic choice for Senator, former Lieutenant Governor William F. Sheehan, was defeated. Although Sheehan had the support of Tammany Hall, insurgent Democratic legislators led by State Senator Franklin Delano Roosevelt revolted against the machine and deadlocked balloting until March. The Roosevelt faction forced a second Democratic caucus in late March to nominate Judge James A. O'Gorman, who was elected on March 31.

Background
Republican Chauncey M. Depew had been re-elected to this seat in 1905, and his term would expire on March 3, 1911.

In the 1910 state election, 29 Democrats, 21 Republicans and 1 Independence Senators were elected for a two-year term (1911–1912), along with 86 Democrats, 63 Republicans and 1 Independence Leaguer were elected for the session of 1911 to the Assembly. The 134th New York State Legislature met from January 4 to October 6, 1911, at Albany, New York.

Candidates

First Democratic caucus

Ex-Lieutenant Governor William F. Sheehan announced his candidature formally in a letter to Mayor of Buffalo Louis P. Fuhrmann which was published on December 30, 1910. Before the State election, when a Democratic victory seemed to be improbable, Sheehan had made an agreement with Tammany Hall leader Charles Francis Murphy that the Tammany men would support Sheehan for the U.S. Senate.

The Democratic caucus met on January 16. 91 State legislators attended, but 25 were absent. Speaker Daniel D. Frisbie presided. The caucus nominated Sheehan. Edward M. Shepard, the defeated Democratic candidate for Mayor of New York in the election of 1901; and Ex-Supreme Court Justice D. Cady Herrick, the defeated Democratic candidate for Governor of New York in the election of 1904, also received votes at this caucus.

At the same time, an anti-Sheehan faction (in the press referred to as "the Insurgents") of 19 State legislators met at the Hampton Hotel, led by State Senator Franklin D. Roosevelt and issued a statement repudiating to take part in a caucus which follows orders from non-member political bosses.

Republican caucus
The Republican caucus met on January 16. They re-nominated the incumbent U.S. Senator Chauncey M. Depew unanimously.

Election proceedings

Deadlock
On January 17, both houses of the state legislature took ballots separately, but no choice was made in either. Sheehan received the votes of the 91 caucus attendees, only 1 short for a nomination in the state senate, and 8 short in the Assembly. On January 18, the state legislature met in joint session, compared the votes of the previous day, found that no choice was made, and proceeded to a joint ballot. On the joint ballot, Assemblyman Lewis S. Chanler, who had been lieutenant governor from 1907 to 1908, and the defeated Democratic candidate for the U.S. Senate in the election of 1909, deserted Sheehan, who received 90 votes, 9 short of election. As no choice was made, joint ballots continued to be taken every day, Monday through Saturday, at noon. Governor of New York John Alden Dix refused to interfere in the contest, but continued to talk privately to Mayor of New York William J. Gaynor, Boss Murphy and a few prospective compromise candidates.

On February 7, after the 18th ballot, the majority leaders, Robert F. Wagner of the state senate and Al Smith of the Assembly, called a conference for the next morning at which both factions would discuss the further proceedings. Both factions met on February 8, maintained their positions, and nothing came of it. About this time, Edward M. Shepard was taken seriously ill, and he would die a few months later.

On February 20, after the 28th ballot, Congressman Martin W. Littleton announced formally his candidature for the senatorship. Littleton had received a few scattering votes throughout the balloting, but nothing came of it.

On February 23, after the 31st ballot, a letter was received from Congressman William Sulzer stating that, if a compromise candidate was sought, he would take the senatorship. Sulzer had received a few scattering votes since the 11th ballot, but nothing came of it either.

On February 25, after the 34th ballot, Edward M. Shepard withdrew from the contest and advised the election of a compromise candidate. Most of the Insurgents then voted for two ballots for John D. Kernan, and then for Littleton.

On February 28, after the 36th ballot, Sheehan sent an open letter to the State legislators in which he declared himself for a new caucus, and his acceptance of any candidate the caucus would choose. The Insurgents answered that a new caucus was useless.

On March 3, after the 39th ballot, Governor Dix advised to abandon Sheehan, and instead to elect immediately someone "whose choice will unite the Democratic Party." Sheehan however refused to withdraw from the contest unless a new caucus chose another candidate, and none of the legislators followed Dix's advice.

On the same day, the term of the incumbent Chauncey M. Depew ended, and the seat became vacant on March 4.

Late election 
President William H. Taft called a special session of the U.S. Senate to convene on April 4, and all parties expressed their hope that a U.S. Senator be elected by then.

On March 7, after the 42nd ballot, Mayor Gaynor seconded Gov. Dix, and advised to abandon Sheehan. Boss Murphy however re-affirmed his support for Sheehan, and the deadlock continued as before.

Intense negotiations followed to make the way clear for a new caucus. On March 18, Boss Murphy consented to a new caucus if the Insurgents accepted the candidate chosen, whoever it be. State Senator Roosevelt refused to be led into this trap, and on March 20 told Gov. Dix that the Insurgents would not be bound by the new caucus choice, expecting the Tammany majority to nominate somebody as objectionable as Sheehan, like Daniel F. Cohalan, De Lancey Nicoll or John B. Stanchfield. On March 22, after the 55th ballot, a conference of all Democratic legislators met and agreed unanimously to call a new caucus for March 27, to reconsider the nomination made on January 16.

Results, up to 58th ballot

Second Democratic caucus
In the morning of March 27, before the 59th ballot, State Senator Edgar T. Brackett, the Republican minority leader, tried to articulate a combination of Republicans and Insurgents to elect an independent Democrat, but was opposed by Edwin A. Merritt, the Republican minority leader in the Assembly, and the offer was turned down by State Senator Roosevelt.

The second Democratic caucus met on the evening of March 27, after the 59th ballot. President pro tempore of the State Senate Robert F. Wagner presided. 90 State legislators attended, among them only 4 Insurgents. Sheehan received 28 votes, and the remainder was scattered among 24 other men, but none for the Insurgents' frontrunner Martin W. Littleton. The caucus then adjourned to meet again on the next evening.

In the morning of March 28, before the 60th ballot, Chauncey M. Depew sent a telegram from Washington, D.C. releasing the Republican State legislators from their caucus pledges, and Merritt now voiced his support of the coalition scheme. Brackett announced that the Republicans would meet in a conference to consider the combination with the Insurgents.

The Democratic caucus met again in the evening of March 28, after the 60th ballot. Four ballots were taken, with no choice, and the caucus adjourned in the small hours of March 29 until the next morning. An hour after the adjournment, a fire broke out in the Assembly library which consumed the west wing of the New York State Capitol. The State Legislature moved to temporary accommodations in the Albany City Hall.

The Republican conference met in the morning of March 29, before the 61st ballot, but many legislators did not appear and no action was taken. Besides, taking the fire as an excuse, most Republicans paired with regular Democrats and went home, so that no quorum was present at the joint sessions of March 29 and 30.

The Democratic caucus met again on March 29, after the 61st ballot, but did not take any vote. State Senator Roosevelt led an Insurgent committee which informed the caucus attendees that, unless one of the names on a list submitted earlier (with the names of Herrick, Gerard, Straus, Glynn, Littleton, Dowling, Van Wyck, Parker, Kernan, Ridder and Carlisle) would be chosen, the Insurgents and Republicans would elect John D. Kernan on the next joint ballot of the state legislature.

On March 30, the announced coalition did not materialize. Despite the Republican leaders supporting the scheme, most legislators did not attend the joint session. Besides, the Democratic caucus did not meet again, the negotiations continued only behind the scenes.

On March 31, Boss Murphy proposed James A. O'Gorman, a justice of the New York Supreme Court whose name had never been mentioned until the first meeting of the second caucus when O'Gorman received a single vote on the first ballot. After some debate, the Insurgents accepted O'Gorman. Thereupon the caucus met again, and 14 Insurgents attended, but Roosevelt did not. O'Gorman was nominated, and the state legislature was convened in the evening to elect him. Thus ended the longest legislative deadlock in New York history after 74 days.

Election results, 59th through 64th ballot

Aftermath
By becoming a leader of the anti-Tammany legislators almost immediately after his election to the state senate, and having survived ten weeks of what a biographer later described as "the full might of Tammany" against him, Roosevelt achieved his first victory as an elective official. This was the last U.S. senatorial election by the state legislature. The U.S. Constitution was amended soon after, and since 1914 U.S. Senators have been elected statewide by popular ballot. O'Gorman took his seat on April 4, 1911, and served a single term, remaining in the U.S. Senate until March 3, 1917. In November 1916, Republican William M. Calder was elected to succeed O'Gorman.

See also 
 United States Senate elections, 1910 and 1911

Notes

Sources
  states results of the vote in the Assembly on pg. 56f, and of the joint ballots through March 28
  states results of joint ballots of March 29 to 31
 
 
 
 
 
  [This article gives a remarkably early insight into the reasons behind the "Insurgency"; i.e. Franklin D. Roosevelt was determined to follow step by step the career of his relative Theodore Roosevelt. Theodore started his political career as a first-term assemblyman upsetting the party machine, and Franklin did exactly that now. Later, Franklin would be, like Theodore, Asst. Secr. of the Navy, Gov. of New York, and vice presidential candidate, until finally achieving the presidency, his goal which he had set himself in 1910.
 
 
 
 
 
 
 
 
 
 
 
 
 
 
 
 
 
 
 
 
 
 
 
 
 
 
 
 
 
 
 
 
 
 
 
 
 
 
 
 
 
 
 
 
 
 
 
 
 
 
 
 
 
 
 
 
 
 
 
 
 
 
 
 
 
 

Franklin D. Roosevelt
United States Senate
1911
New York